Derhamia hoffmannorum is a species of freshwater fish endemic to Guyana, where it is found in the Mazaruni River.  It is the only species in its genus. It is found in fresh water at pelagic depths  in a tropical climate.  The average length of an unsexed male is about 6.1 cm (2.4 in). It has an elongated body with large eyes. It is a timid species compared to other similar species such as the various pencilfish. They live near the surface of water and are known to hide whenever possible, usually under floating objects. This species only eats what can be found at the surface, as well. D. hoffmannorum will not seek food that sinks to the bottom.

The fish is named in honor of Peter Hoffman and Martin Hoffman (Salzgitter and Hanover, Germany, respectively), who collected the holotype specimens in the wild and brought back and acclimated other specimens to captivity, giving authors additional information about its biology that could not have been known by studying them in the wild.

References

Lebiasinidae
Monotypic fish genera
Freshwater fish of South America
Fish of Guyana
Endemic fauna of Guyana
Taxa named by Jacques Géry
Taxa named by Axel Zarske
Fish described in 2002